Oakland is an unincorporated community in Plain Township, Franklin County, Ohio, United States.

References 

Unincorporated communities in Franklin County, Ohio